Raymond Cornelius Boyle (June 28, 1923 – January 6, 2022), also known as Ray Boyle and Dirk London, was an American film and television actor. He was perhaps best known for playing Morgan Earp in the American western television series The Life and Legend of Wyatt Earp.

Life and career 
Boyle was born in Lisbon, North Dakota, the son of Elma Mae Harrison and Cornelius Hugh Boyle. He had two sisters. Boyle served in the United States Marine Corps during World War II training at Marine Corps Base Camp Pendleton. 

After working as a model, Boyle’s career as an actor started in 1952 with a role in the film Zombies of the Stratosphere. He then made his television debut in the science fiction television series Captain Video and His Video Rangers, where he made two appearances as Luny O'Brien. Boyle made an uncredited appearance in the 1953 film Bad for Each Other. In 1954, he made a guest-starring appearance in the western television series Death Valley Days. That same year, he appeared in the films Ride Clear of Diablo, Prisoner of War,  Return from the Sea and The Bridges at Toko-Ri. Around 1956 he ran an actors’ workshop.

In 1956, Boyle was cast as Morgan Earp in the ABC western television series The Life and Legend of Wyatt Earp. His character was the brother of Wyatt Earp, who was played by Hugh O'Brian. He appeared in the films The Lonely Man, Ambush at Cimarron Pass and The Purple Gang.

Boyle guest-starred in television programs including, Gunsmoke, Perry Mason, Lawman, Tales of the Texas Rangers, Harbor Command, Navy Log, The Adventures of Rin Tin Tin and Highway Patrol. He worked as a production designer for films. In the 1990s, he made appearances in the television programs ER and Beverly Hills, 90210. In 1996, he played Benny in the television comedy show Night Stand with Dick Dietrick, which was presented by Timothy Stack.

Personal life 
Boyle met Jan Shepard in 1951. They wed on February 6, 1954. They had a son, Brandon, who was born in April 1959. Boyle and Shepard stayed married for 67 years, until Boyle's death.

Death 
Boyle died in Burbank, California on January 6, 2022, aged 98. He was buried in Valhalla Memorial Park Cemetery.

References

External links 

Rotten Tomatoes profile

1923 births
2022 deaths
People from Lisbon, North Dakota
Male actors from Los Angeles
Male actors from North Dakota
American male film actors
American male television actors
20th-century American male actors
Western (genre) television actors
American production designers
Models from Los Angeles
Burials at Valhalla Memorial Park Cemetery
Models from North Dakota